The Criminal Law Amendment Act 1871 (34 & 35 Vict. c.32) is an Act of the Parliament of the United Kingdom passed by W. E. Gladstone's Liberal Government. It was passed on the same day as the Trade Union Act 1871.

William Edward Hartpole Lecky described the Act's implications:

...[the Act] inflicted a punishment of three months' imprisonment, with hard labour, on any one who attempts to coerce another for trade purposes by the use of personal violence; by such threats as would justify a magistrate in binding a man to keep the peace; or by persistently following a person about from place to place, hiding his tools, clothes, or other property, watching and besetting his house, or following him along any street or road with two or more other persons in a disorderly manner. These last clauses were directed against the practice of picketing...

It was repealed by Benjamin Disraeli's Conservative Government in 1875, which legalised picketing with their Conspiracy and Protection of Property Act 1875 (this Act was repealed by section 17 of that Act) and Employers and Workmen Act 1875.

See also
Criminal Law Amendment Act

Notes

United Kingdom Acts of Parliament 1871
1871 in British law
United Kingdom labour law
British trade unions history
Criminal law of the United Kingdom
1871 in labor relations